Leptomyrmex nigriceps is a species of ant in the genus Leptomyrmex. Described by Carlo Emery in 1914, the species is endemic to New Caledonia.

References

Dolichoderinae
Insects of New Caledonia
Insects described in 1914